Frank O. Bastian is an American medical doctor and neuropathologist, who previously worked at Louisiana State University, moved to a university in New Orleans
in 2019. He specializes in the transmissible spongiform encephalopathies (TSEs), which include, but are not limited to, Bovine spongiform encephalopathy (BSE) "Mad cow disease" in cattle, scrapie in sheep and goats, and Creutzfeldt–Jakob disease (CJD) in humans.

Bastian challenges the widely popular theory that the TSEs are caused by prions, which are composed mostly if not entirely of a misfolded form of a protein called PrP (i.e. PrPSc). He claims instead that the TSEs are caused by an extremely small, cell wall deficient bacterium called Spiroplasma, and that prions are the result of the disease process. The lack of a cell wall means it is not susceptible to most common antibiotics such as penicillin, which target cell wall synthesis. Bastian first found Spiroplasma in the brain of a CJD patient in an autopsy in 1979. He later demonstrated that Spiroplasma mirum strain SMCA (suckling mouse cataract agent) induces a microcystic spongiform encephalopathy in suckling rats that is similar to rat CJD. In 2007 he isolated Spiroplasma from scrapie and Chronic wasting disease (a TSE affecting deer, elk, and moose, abbreviated CWD), cultured them, and inoculated them into sheep and deer.

According to Bastian, the scrapie and CWD Spiroplasma isolates caused a spongiform encephalopathy identical to scrapie and CWD. Under his hypothesis, because PrPSc is not the cause it is merely an imperfect marker of infection (with both sensitivity and NPV <1), and is either induced by Spiroplasma directly or by a defence mechanism of the host.

In 2014 he discovered that Spiroplasma forms biofilms which give them significant resistance to radiation, heat, and disinfectants. He, along with Laura Manuelidis of Yale University, who claims that the TSEs are caused by an as yet undiscovered virus, are two of the main sceptics of the prion theory. Other scientists have so far been unable to duplicate his results, casting doubt on this hypothesis. Bastian however maintains that the inability to detect Spiroplasma in 100% of cases stems from genetic variability of cases.

Publications

See also
 Laura Manuelidis
 Stanley Prusiner
 Prion
 Slow virus
 Virino
 Spiroplasma

References

Living people
American neurologists
American pathologists
Prions
Year of birth missing (living people)